Scleromystax salmacis is a species of catfish of the family Callichthyidae.  S. salmacis has the southernmost distribution of its genus. It is known from the Mampituba River and Araranguá River basins in southern Santa Catarina State of Brazil, and the Ratones River, a small coastal river drainage in Florianópolis.

References 
 

Callichthyidae
Catfish of South America
Fish of Brazil
Fish described in 2005
Taxa named by Marcelo Ribeiro de Britto
Taxa named by Roberto Esser dos Reis